Mill Creek is a  long 3rd order tributary to the Pee Dee River in Anson County, North Carolina.

Course
Mill Creek rises about 3 miles southwest of Morven, North Carolina. Mill Creek then flows east-northeast to meet the Pee Dee River about 1.5 miles northeast of Old Sneedsboro.

Watershed
Mill Creek drains  of area, receives about 48.0 in/year of precipitation, has a topographic wetness index of 480.70 and is about 45% forested.

References

Rivers of North Carolina
Rivers of Anson County, North Carolina
Tributaries of the Pee Dee River